Giovanni Battista Bissoni (1576–1636) was an Italian painter. He was born in Padua. He was first a pupil of Francesco Apollodoro, called Il Porcia, a portrait painter, and afterwards of Dario Varotari the Elder. Bissoni painted for the churches and convents at Padua and Ravenna. In the refectory of the convent of San Vitale, he painted a Last Supper.

References

1576 births
1636 deaths
16th-century Italian painters
Italian male painters
17th-century Italian painters
Painters from Padua